Julius Adolf Oskar von Riesenthal (18 September 1830 – 22 January 1898) was a German forester, ornithologist, hunter and writer.

He was born in Breslau, Silesia (then in Prussia: now Wrocław, Poland), to a family of Austrian descent. His father died when he was a year old, and he moved with his mother to Oels (now Oleśnica), where he spent his childhood and early youth until matriculating from Gymnasium. He studied at the Eberswalde Forestry Academy in Neustadt-Eberswalde, becoming a Revierförster (district forest ranger) in the Tuchola Forest, where he began studying ornithology. In 1871 he became Oberförster (chief forester) in Altenkirchen, where he wrote his first book, Die Raubvögel Deutschlands und des angrenzenden Mitteleuropas (Birds of Prey of Germany and adjoining Central Europe). He later became Royal Forester for the Department of Agriculture, Forestry and Domains in Charlottenburg, where he stayed until his death in 1898.

Works

 Die Raubvögel Deutschlands und des angrenzenden Mitteleuropas, 1879.
 Das Waidwerk: Handbuch der Naturgeschichte, Jagd und Hege aller in Mitteleuropa Jagdbaren Thiere (The Chase: Manual of Natural History, Hunting and the Protection of Game Animals in Central Europe), 1880.
 Jagdlexikon (Hunting Lexicon), 1882.
 Die Kleine Jagd: Fur Jäger und Jagdliebhaber (The Little Hunt: for Hunters and Hunting Enthusiasts), 1884: he revised the fifth edition of this book by Friedrich Ernst Jester
 Die Kennzeichen der Vögel Mitteleuropas und angrenzender Gebiete (The Characteristics of the Birds of Central Europe and Adjacent Areas), 1891.
 Bilder aus der Tucheler Heide: galgenhumoristische Gesänge; zur Erbaulichkeit aller Grünröcke und ihrer Freunde (Scenes from the Tuchola Forest: gallows-humour songs for the edification of the greendresses and their friends), 1896.
 Die Stiefel des Herrn Oberforstmeisters, Der verrückte Keiler, sowie andere lustige Geschichten und Gedichte aus dem Leben eines alten Forstmannes (The Boots of the Chief Forester, the Crazy Wild Boar, and other Funny Stories and Poems from the Life of an Old Forester), published posthumously, 1903.

Jägermeister
The first stanza from one of his poems, "Waidmannsheil" ("Hunter's Salute"), is printed on the Jägermeister bottle label.

Waidmannsheil

References 
Primary reference: pp412–413, Volume 8 of Deutsche Biographische Enzyklopädie, Rudolf Vierhaus, Walter de Gruyter, 2005,  (Google Books)

External links
 

1830 births
1898 deaths
19th-century German people
German ornithologists
German foresters
German hunters
German untitled nobility
German people of Austrian descent
People from the Province of Silesia
Writers from Wrocław
Eberswalde University for Sustainable Development alumni
German male writers